Pedro Gonçalo Gonçalves Mesquita Cardoso (born 28 December 1990), often known simply as Gonçalo, is a Portuguese footballer who plays for Leça FC.

Club career
He made his professional debut in the Segunda Liga for Vitória Guimarães B on 18 August 2012 in a game against Sporting B.

He made his Primeira Liga debut for Vitória Guimarães on 20 January 2013, when he came on as a late substitute for Luís Rocha in a 3–1 victory over Rio Ave.

References

External links

1990 births
Sportspeople from Guimarães
Living people
Portuguese footballers
Association football defenders
F.C. Vizela players
G.D. Tourizense players
Vitória S.C. B players
Liga Portugal 2 players
Vitória S.C. players
Primeira Liga players
GD Bragança players
S.C. Espinho players
G.D. Gafanha players